Amaranthe is a Swedish heavy metal band from Gothenburg, known for their unique combination of pop rock and death metal. Their discography consists of five studio albums, one compilation album, one extended play, fourteen singles, and eleven music videos. To date, the band has sold 500,000 album copies worldwide.

The band was formed in 2008, under the original name Avalanche. After signing a recording contract with Spinefarm Records, they changed their name to Amaranthe, and released the extended play Leave Everything Behind (2009). The band's debut studio album, Amaranthe (2011), achieved moderate chart success in Sweden, Finland, and Japan. Their second album, The Nexus (2013), peaked within the top ten in both Sweden and Finland, and sold 1,700 copies in its first week.

Massive Addictive (2014), Amaranthe's third album, found chart success in new territories, including Germany and the United States. The album featured the single "Drop Dead Cynical", which reached number twenty-seven on the Mainstream Rock chart in the United States, their first and only single to do so. After the release of the compilation album Breaking Point: B-Sides 2011–2015 (2015), the band recorded their fourth album Maximalism (2016). Continuing on the success of Massive Addictive, it charted within the top ten in Sweden and Finland, and found commercial success in several other territories. The album was nominated for a Grammis award for Best Hard Rock/Heavy Metal album.

Albums

Studio albums

Compilation albums

Extended plays

Singles

Music videos

Guest appearances

"Army of the Night" (Powerwolf cover - originally from the album Blessed & Possessed (July 17, 2015), released on July 20, 2018 on the Communio Lupatum of Powerwolf's album The Sacrament of Sin)

Notes

References

External links
Amaranthe at AllMusic
Amaranthe at Discogs

Heavy metal group discographies
Discographies of Swedish artists